Æthelberht (Old English: Æðelbrihte, ÆÞelberhte), also called Saint Ethelbert the King (died 20 May 794 at Sutton Walls, Herefordshire), was an eighth-century saint and a king of East Anglia, the Anglo-Saxon kingdom which today includes the English counties of Norfolk and Suffolk. Little is known of his reign, which may have begun in 779, according to later sources, and very few of the coins he issued have been discovered. It is known from the Anglo-Saxon Chronicle that he was killed on the orders of Offa of Mercia in 794.

Æthelberht was locally canonised and became the focus of cults in East Anglia and at Hereford, where the shrine of the saintly king once existed. In the absence of known historical facts, mediaeval chroniclers provided their own details for his ancestry, life as king, and death at the hands of Offa. His feast day is 20 May. There are churches in Norfolk, Suffolk and the west of England dedicated to him, and he is a joint patron of Hereford Cathedral.

Life and reign 

Little is known of Æthelberht's life or reign, as few East Anglian records have survived from this period. Æthelberht's reign may have begun in 779, the date provided on the uncertain authority of a much later saint's life. Mediaeval chroniclers have provided dubious accounts of his life, in the absence of any real details. According to Richard of Cirencester, writing in the 15th century, Æthelberht's parents were Æthelred I of East Anglia and Leofrana of Mercia. Richard narrates in detail a story of Æthelberht's piety, election as king and wise rule. Urged to marry against his will, he apparently agreed to wed Eadburh, the daughter of Offa of Mercia, and set out to visit her, despite his mother's forebodings and his experiences of terrifying events—an earthquake, a solar eclipse and a vision.

Four pennies minted by Æthelberht are known—two of which have been known since the 18th century, and one since the beginning of the 20th century. One of these, a 'light' penny, said to have been discovered in 1908 at Tivoli, near Rome, is similar in type to the coinage of Offa. On one side is the word REX, with an image of Romulus and Remus suckling a wolf: the obverse names the king and his moneyer, Lul, who also struck coins for Offa and Coenwulf of Mercia. The author Andy Hutcheson has suggested that the use of runes on the coin may signify "continuing strong control by local leaders". The numismatist Marion Archibald notes that the issuing of "flattering" coins of this type, with the intention to win friends in Rome, probably indicated that as a sub-king, Æthelberht was assuming "a greater degree of independence than [Offa] was prepared to tolerate".

The coins provide one of the few contemporary sources for Æthelberht. In March 2014 the fourth coin was discovered in Sussex by a metal detectorist. According to the British numismatist Rory Naismith, "Æthelberht’s coins could have been issued over a number of years, either during a spell when some or all of East Anglia asserted independence from Offa, or by some sort of arrangement to share minting rights with the Mercian ruler." Offa stopped Æthelberht from minting his own coins.

In 793 the vulnerability of the English east coast was exposed when the monastery at Lindisfarne was looted by Vikings, and a year later Jarrow was also attacked, which the historian Steven Plunkett reasons would ensure that the East Anglians were "forced to seek firm leadership" in order to strengthen the region's defences. Æthelberht's claim to belong to the ruling Wuffingas dynasty, suggested by the use of a Roman she-wolf and the title REX on his coins, arose from the need for strong kingship in response to the Viking attacks.

Death and canonisation 

Æthelberht was put to death by Offa under unclear circumstances, apparently at the royal vill at Sutton Walls. According to the Anglo-Saxon Chronicle, he was beheaded. Mediaeval sources tell how he was captured while visiting his future bride Ælfthyth and was then murdered and buried. In Richard of Cirencester's account, which cannot be substantiated, Offa's evil queen Cynethryth persuaded her husband to kill his guest, who was then bound and beheaded by a certain Grimbert, and his body disposed of. The mediaeval historian John Brompton's Chronicon describes how the king's detached head fell off a cart into a ditch where it was found, before it restored a blind man's sight. According to the Chronicon, Ælfthyth became a recluse at Crowland and her remorseful father founded monasteries, gave land to the Church and travelled on a pilgrimage to Rome.

The execution of an Anglo-Saxon king on the orders of another ruler was very rare, although criminals were hanged and beheaded, as has been discovered at Sutton Hoo. Æthelberht's death made the possibility of any peaceful union between the Anglian peoples, including Mercia, less likely than before. 

In 2014, metal-detectorist Darrin Simpson found a coin minted by Æthelbert in a Sussex field. Such coins, struck as a sign of independence, may have led to Æthelbert's death. It sold at auction on 11 June 2014 for £78,000.

Legacy

Veneration 

After his death, Æthelberht was canonised by the English Church. A number of Lives of St Æthelberht were written during the Middle Ages, including those by Gerald of Wales and Osbert of Clare in the 12th century, and hagiographies by Roger of Wendover and Matthew Paris the following century.

He was venerated in religious cults in both East Anglia and at Hereford. The Anglo-Saxon church of the episcopal estate at Hoxne was one of several dedicated to him in Suffolk. The church is mentioned in the  will of Theodreusus, Bishop of London and Hoxne (c. 938 – c. 951), which is a possible indication of the existence of a religious cult devoted to the saintly king. Only three dedications for Æthelberht are near where he died – Marden, Hereford Cathedral and Littledean – the other eleven being in Norfolk or Suffolk. The historian Lawrence Butler has argued that this unusual pattern may be explained by the existence of a royal cult in East Anglia, which represented a "revival of Christianity after the Danish settlement by commemorating a politically 'safe' and corporeally distant local ruler".

Christian buildings dedicated to Æthelberht 

The Blessed Virgin Mary and St. Ethelbert are joint patrons of Hereford Cathedral, where the music for the Office of St Ethelbert survives in the 13th century Hereford Noted Breviary.

St. Ethelbert's Gate is one of the two main entrances to the precinct of Norwich Cathedral. The chapel at Albrightestone, at a location near an important excavated Anglo-Saxon cemetery at Boss Hall in Ipswich, was dedicated to Æthelberht. In Wiltshire, the Church of England parish church at Luckington is dedicated to St Mary and St Ethelbert. In Norfolk, the Church of England parish churches at Alby, East Wretham, Larling, Thurton, Mundham and Burnham Sutton (where there are remains of the ruined church) and the Suffolk churches at Falkenham, Hessett, Herringswell and Tannington are all dedicated to the saint. In neighbouring Essex, the parish church at Belchamp Otten is dedicated to St Ethelbert and All Saints, and the church at Stanway, originally an Anglo-Saxon chapel, is dedicated to St Albright, which is believed to be the same saint. In 1937, St Ethelbert's name was added to the parish church of St George in East Ham, Essex (now London), at the behest of Hereford Cathedral which had funded the rebuilding of the church, previously a temporary wooden structure.

References

Sources

External links 

 
 Facsimile of the manuscript of Passio sancti athelberhti in the Parker Library, Corpus Christi College
 Two Lives of St. Ethelbert by M.R. James, which was published in English Historical Review, volume 32 (1917), from the Internet Archive.

8th-century Christian saints
794 deaths
East Anglian monarchs
East Anglian saints
Burials at Hereford Cathedral
8th-century Christian martyrs
8th-century English monarchs
Christian royal saints
Year of birth unknown